Łykowo  is a village in the administrative district of Gmina Dygowo, within Kołobrzeg County, West Pomeranian Voivodeship, in north-western Poland.

The village has an approximate population of 100.

Notable residents
 Alfred Nähring (1910–1991), German officer

References

Villages in Kołobrzeg County